Central City is a city in Sebastian County, Arkansas, United States. It is part of the Fort Smith, Arkansas-Oklahoma Metropolitan Statistical Area. At the 2010 Census, the population of Central City was 502.  According to the 2018 US Census Bureau estimates, Central City had a population of 497.

Geography 
Central City is located at  (35.326587, -94.240225).

According to the United States Census Bureau, the town has a total area of 5.6 km2 (2.2 mi2), all land.

Demographics 

As of the census of 2000, there were 531 people, 216 households, and 166 families residing in the town.  The population density was 94.5/km2 (245.1/mi2).  There were 227 housing units at an average density of 40.4/km2 (104.8/mi2).  The racial makeup of the town was 96.23% White, 1.51% Black or African American, 0.94% from other races, and 1.32% from two or more races.  1.69% of the population were Hispanic or Latino of any race.

There were 216 households, out of which 26.4% had children under the age of 18 living with them, 66.2% were married couples living together, 8.8% had a female householder with no husband present, and 23.1% were non-families. 21.8% of all households were made up of individuals, and 7.4% had someone living alone who was 65 years of age or older.  The average household size was 2.42 and the average family size was 2.81.

In the town, the population was spread out, with 20.3% under the age of 18, 7.2% from 18 to 24, 27.3% from 25 to 44, 31.3% from 45 to 64, and 13.9% who were 65 years of age or older.  The median age was 41 years. For every 100 females, there were 93.8 males.  For every 100 females age 18 and over, there were 91.4 males.

The median income for a household in the town was $38,173, and the median income for a family was $43,958. Males had a median income of $31,964 versus $20,875 for females. The per capita income for the town was $15,892.  About 7.8% of families and 15.8% of the population were below the poverty line, including 20.3% of those under age 18 and 7.9% of those age 65 or over.

Education 
Lavaca School District is an accredited public school district that encompasses  of land including Lavaca and Central City, and provides early childhood, elementary and secondary education to students leading to graduation from Lavaca High School.

References 

Towns in Sebastian County, Arkansas
Towns in Arkansas
Fort Smith metropolitan area